Mercedes is the capital and largest city of the department of Soriano in Uruguay. According to the census 2011, it is the tenth most populated city of the country.

Mercedes is an important centre of tourism, commerce and a commercial port. Its main industries are based on agriculture, dairy products, paper manufacturing and industrial activities. Its rambla (riverside promenade) is one of the widest in the country.

History
Mercedes was founded in 1788 by the priest Manuel Antonio de Castro y Careaga with the name of Capilla Nueva de las Mercedes. It had acquired the status of "Villa" (town) before the Independence of Uruguay. On 6 July 1857, its status was elevated to "Ciudad" (city) and it was designated as capital of Soriano, one of the nine original departments of the Republic at the time, by the Act of Law Nº 531. Previously, the capital of the department was Villa Soriano.

Population
In 2011, it had a population of about 41,974
 
Source: Instituto Nacional de Estadística de Uruguay

Geography
The city is located on the junction of Route 2 with Route 14, and is situated on the south bank of the Río Negro. Also Route 21 from Colonia del Sacramento of Colonia Department terminates in this city.

Climate

Places of worship
 Cathedral of Our Lady of Mercy (Roman Catholic)
 Sacred Heart of Jesus Parish Church (Roman Catholic)
 St. John the Baptist Parish Church (Roman Catholic, Sisters of the Divine Savior)
 St. Pius X Parish Church (Roman Catholic)

Sports
Mercedes was one of the host cities of the official 1967 Basketball World Cup.

Notable people
 

Ricardo Paseyro (1925–2009), diplomat and poet

References

External links

INE map of Mercedes

Populated places in the Soriano Department
Populated places established in 1788
1788 establishments in the Spanish Empire